Yokomizo (written: 横溝) is a Japanese surname. Notable people with the surname include:

, Japanese racing driver
, Japanese middle-distance runner
, Japanese writer
, Japanese photographer
 Yuri Yokomizo, Japanese illustrator and graphic designer

Japanese-language surnames